Giovanni Riccanale (1634 – March, 1685) was a Roman Catholic prelate who served as Bishop of Boiano (1684–1685).

Biography
Giovanni Riccanale was born in Teramo, Italy in 1634. On 2 October 1684, he was appointed during the papacy of Pope Innocent XI as Bishop of Boiano. On 8 October 1684, he was consecrated bishop by Alessandro Crescenzi (cardinal), Cardinal-Priest of Santa Prisca, with Pier Antonio Capobianco, Bishop Emeritus of Lacedonia, and Benedetto Bartolo, Bishop of Belcastro, serving as co-consecrators. He served as Bishop of Boiano until his death in March 1685.

References

External links and additional sources
 (for Chronology of Bishops) 
 (for Chronology of Bishops) 

17th-century Italian Roman Catholic bishops
Bishops appointed by Pope Innocent XI
1634 births
1685 deaths